Maria Josepha Amalia of Saxony (Maria Josepha Amalia Beatrix Xaveria Vincentia Aloysia Franziska de Paula Franziska de Chantal Anna Apollonia Johanna Nepomucena Walburga Theresia Ambrosia; 6 December 1803 – 18 May 1829) was Queen of Spain as the third wife of King Ferdinand VII of Spain. She was the youngest daughter of Prince Maximilian of Saxony (1759–1838) and his first wife, Princess Carolina of Parma (1770–1804), daughter of Duke Ferdinand of Parma. She was a member of the house of Wettin.

Childhood

Princess Maria Josepha Amalia was born in Dresden, Germany, to Princess Carolina of Parma and Maximilian, Crown Prince of Saxony. Maria lost her mother when she was only a few months old; due to this, her father sent her to a convent near the Elbe river, where she was brought up by nuns. As a result, Maria had a strict religious upbringing and was a fervent Catholic all her life.

Since King Ferdinand VII of Spain was widowed and looking for a wife, Maria's father, Crown Prince Maximilian, suggested that his youngest daughter Maria could marry him. The marriage was soon negotiated by the Marquis de Cerrlvo. The king was reportedly enthralled by her, and decided to marry her.

Queen of Spain
King Ferdinand and Princess Maria married on 20 October 1819, in Madrid. Henceforth, Maria was known as the queen consort of Spain. Although the new queen was young, naive and inexperienced, the king fell in love with her because of her kind demeanour.

After the king's two childless marriages, there was great pressure for the Bourbon dynasty in Spain to ensure that King Ferdinand VII had an heir. On the wedding night, Maria was terrified since she had been educated in a very religious environment, thus never being told anything about sexuality. After Ferdinand entered her chambers completely naked, she ran out of the room screaming in fear, which angered her husband. Maria returned to her chambers moments later, after some convincing from her sister-in-law Infanta Maria Francisca of Portugal, but she was so deeply terrified she urinated and defecated on herself just before intercourse, further angering Ferdinand and preventing the marriage from being consummated. 
After the failed wedding night, Maria refused to sleep with the king for a long time. It took a personal letter sent by Pope Pius VII in order to convince the queen that sexual relations between spouses were not contrary to the morality of Catholicism. She finally agreed to share the bed with her husband and consummate the marriage, on the condition that they both pray before carrying out the sexual act, which he accepted without objection.
Nevertheless, the marriage remained childless and Maria Josepha Amalia withdrew from public life, with long stays in the Palace of Aranjuez, in La Granja de San Ildefonso and the Royal Palace of Riofrio.  
She died as a result of fevers on 18 May 1829 in Aranjuez, leaving her husband heartbroken, and was buried in El Escorial. Her husband remarried for the fourth time to Maria Christina of the Two Sicilies who eventually gave birth to the future Queen Isabella II of Spain.

Ancestry

References

External links

|-

1803 births
1829 deaths
Nobility from Dresden
German Roman Catholics
House of Wettin
Regents of Spain
Spanish royal consorts
Saxon princesses
Burials in the Pantheon of Infantes at El Escorial
19th-century Spanish women
19th-century Spanish people
19th-century German women
19th-century German people
Albertine branch